The Este River (in Portuguese Rio Este) is a river in Portugal. It flows into the Ave River.

The source of the river is in Este (São Pedro e São Mamede), Braga. Along its  course to the Ave River, it passes through Famalicão and Póvoa de Varzim.

Rivers of Portugal
Tributaries of the Ave River